Nino van den Beemt (born 14 June 1995) is a Dutch football player. He plays for Excelsior Maassluis.

Club career
He made his Eerste Divisie debut for Cambuur on 10 December 2018 in a game against Jong PSV, as a starter.

References

External links
 

1995 births
Living people
Dutch footballers
Association football midfielders
SC Cambuur players
Excelsior Maassluis players
Eerste Divisie players
Footballers from Rotterdam